Yoshizaki (written: 吉崎 or 芳崎) is a Japanese surname. Notable people with the surname include:

, Japanese animator
, Japanese manga artist
, Japanese manga artist
, Japanese footballer

See also
Yoshizaki-gobō, a former Buddhist temple in Arawashi, Sakai District, Fukui Prefecture, Japan

Japanese-language surnames